Vanidasan (July 22, 1915 - August 7, 1974) was a 20th-century Tamil poet. He was known to be one from Pavalar generation known as 'Bharathidasan's poetic ancestry'. He was an expert in Tamil, Telugu, English and French. He published over 17 collections of poetry, including several novels in poetry form.

Early life 
He was born in Villianur, next to Puducherry. His father Thirukkaamu and mother Tulsiammal named him Arangasamy. His was also known by his nickname 'Rami'.

He was taught in primary school by the writer Bharathidasan. He started writing under the pen name ‘Ra-Mi’. He published his songs in the book Tamil Kavithai Kalanjiyam published by Sahitya Akademi and in another book published by the Southern Language Book Publishing Group. His songs have been translated into Russian and English. He was also proficient in French, in which he published Tamil-French Kaiagara Mudali.

In 1935, Vanidasan married Adilakshmi, niece of his step-mother. They had nine children, male and female. The eldest of them, Madhuri, married V Kaliyamoorthy on 10 May 1959 under the leadership of Mayilai Sivamuthu.

Honours 
He was complimented as the 'Wordsworth of Tamil Nadu' as his songs excelled in portraying nature. He received the Chevalier honour from the French president. Titles such as 'Pavalar Mani' and 'Paavendar' were also given to Vanidasan. He worked as a Tamil teacher for 34 years of his life. He was also praised by scholar Thiru. V. Kalyanasundaram for his works. Mayilai Sivamuthu lauded him as the 'Tagore of Tamil Nadu'.

Legacy 
Vanidasan died on 7 August 1974. A government high school in Seliamedu was named after him. The Tamil Nadu government has also nationalised his works.

Bibliography 

Iravu Varavillai
Inba Ilakiyam
Inikum Paatu
Ezhil Virutham
Ezhiloviyam
Kulanthai Ilakiyam
Kodi Mullai
Siritha Nuna
Tamizhachi
Theertha Yathirai
Thoduvaanam
Paataranga Padalgal
Paatu Pirakumadaa
Periya Edathu Seithi
Pokarparisu
Vanidasan Poems — First Vol
Vanidasan Poetry — Second Vol
Vanidasan Poetry — Third Vol

References

External links 
 Works by Vanidasan — Tamil Virtual Academy (in Tamil)

1974 deaths
1915 births
Indian poets
Tamil poets
Tamil writers
Poets from Puducherry
Indian Tamil people
20th-century Indian poets